Burnstown Township is a township in Brown County, Minnesota, United States. The population was 260 as of the 2000 census.

History
Burnstown Township was organized in 1871. It was named for J. F. Burns, an early settler.

Geography

The eastern three-quarters of the city of Springfield is within the township geographically but is a separate entity.

Major highway
  U.S. Highway 14

Lake
 Boise Lake

Adjacent townships
 Brookville Township, Redwood County (north)
 Prairieville Township (northeast)
 Leavenworth Township (east)
 Bashaw Township (south)
 Stately Township (southwest)
 North Star Township (west)
 Sundown Township, Redwood County (northwest)

Cemeteries
The township includes the following cemeteries: Saint Paul, Saint Rachael, Saint Raphael and Springfield.

Demographics
As of the census of 2000, there were 260 people, 106 households, and 75 families residing in the township.  The population density was 7.5 people per square mile (2.9/km2).  There were 119 housing units at an average density of 3.4/sq mi (1.3/km2).  The racial makeup of the township was 99.62% White and 0.38% Asian. Hispanic or Latino of any race were 0.38% of the population.

There were 106 households, out of which 32.1% had children under the age of 18 living with them, 66.0% were married couples living together, 0.9% had a female householder with no husband present, and 29.2% were non-families. 26.4% of all households were made up of individuals, and 10.4% had someone living alone who was 65 years of age or older.  The average household size was 2.45 and the average family size was 2.96.

In the township the population was spread out, with 26.5% under the age of 18, 9.2% from 18 to 24, 21.9% from 25 to 44, 25.4% from 45 to 64, and 16.9% who were 65 years of age or older.  The median age was 40 years. For every 100 females, there were 126.1 males.  For every 100 females age 18 and over, there were 127.4 males.

The median income for a household in the township was $34,375, and the median income for a family was $42,500. Males had a median income of $30,469 versus $18,750 for females. The per capita income for the township was $18,919.  About 8.1% of families and 5.5% of the population were below the poverty line, including 4.4% of those under the age of eighteen and none of those 65 or over.

References
 United States National Atlas
 United States Census Bureau 2007 TIGER/Line Shapefiles
 United States Board on Geographic Names (GNIS)

Townships in Brown County, Minnesota
Townships in Minnesota